Peter Nwaoduah was Director General of the State Security Service (SSS) under General Sani Abacha. He headed the department from October 1992-1998, taking orders from Major Hamza al-Mustapha.

Career 
His appointment was considered one well deserved because of the choice of the former head of state, General Sani Abacha to choose his appointees on the basis on competence without prejudice to religious or ethnic backgrounds. Mr Peter Nwaoduah was one among many southerners appointed by Abacha who were acclaimed the best cabinet in the country's history comprising Lateef Jakande, Bamanga Tukur, Adamu Ciroma, Anthony Ani, Olu Onagoruwa, Abubakar Rimi, Walter Ofonagoro, Uche Chukwumerije, Babagana Kingibe (M.K.O Abiola’s running mate), Sarki Tafida, and Tom Ikimi.

National honor 
He was among 183 Nigerians recognized and conferred with awards including 13 awardees are to receive the Commander of the Federal Republic, CFR; 27 to get Commander of the Niger, CON, 43 would get Order of the Federal Republic, OFR; 46 to be given Order of the Niger, OON; 22 would have Member of the Federal Republic, MFR; while 25 would be honored with Member of the Niger, MON. Four others will get FRM I while three would be bestowed with FRM II. Mr Nwaoduah was listed for conferment of the Order of the Federal Republic (OFR) alongside other personalities like:
 Abdulkadir, Prof. Dan_Datti OFR
 Aina, Lawrence Olusegun OFR
 Ajumogobia, Odein, SAN OFR
 Akaahs, Justice Kumai Bayang OFR
 Akpan, Major_General Edet OFR
 Alkali, Air Câ€™dre Ibrahim OFR
 Asika, Dr. (Mrs.) Edith Chinyere OFR
 Batagarawa, Alhaji Ahmadi (Rtd.) Grand Khadi OFR
 Bauchi, Sheikh Dahiru Usman OFR
 Bello, Senator Muhammad Kanti OFR
 Bonet, Chief Ufuwai OFR
 Bozimo, Justice Rosaline Patricia Irorefe OFR
 Braid, Prof. (Mrs.) Ekanem OFR
 Chukkol, Prof. Kharisu Sufiyan OFR
 Edebiri, Prof. Unionmwam OFR
 Edu, Yomi OFR
 Gwadabe, Alhaji Musa OFR
 Inde, Abdullahi Dikko OFR
 Jidda, Amb. Baba Ahmad OFR
 Kuye, Senator Jibril Martins OFR
 Lot, Sylvanus David OFR
 Mohammed, Brig. General Garba (Rtd.) OFR
 Muhammad, Justice Musa Dattijo OFR
 Ndoma_Egba, Senator Victor, SAN OFR
 Nwadialo, Bernard Shaw OFR
 and so many others. 
Not much is known about his early life and career. He took over the leadership of the SSS from Albert Horsfall and handed over to Colonel Kayode Are in 1998. He acquired his Service residence in Asokoro, Abuja in 1999.

References

Year of birth missing
Possibly living people
Directors General of the State Security Service (Nigeria)
Nigerian security personnel